Reutemann is a surname. Notable people with the surname include:

 Carlos Reutemann (1942–2021), Argentine racing driver 
 Mariano Reutemann (born 1977), Argentine windsurfer

German-language surnames